Edmund Harris Thornburgh Plant (10 December 1844 – 28 April 1926) was a mill owner and company director of mines in the Charters Towers-Ravenswood and a politician in Queensland, Australia.

Early life 
Edmund Harris Thornburgh Plant was born on 10 December 1844 in Nottingham, England, the son of C. Frederick Plant and his wife Maria (née Neville).

Politics 
Plant was appointed a member of the Queensland Legislative Council on 8 June 1905. A lifetime appointment, he remained in the Council until its abolition on 23 March 1922.

Later life 
Plant died on 28 April 1926 at Sandgate and was buried in Bald Hills Cemetery.

Legacy 
The Rooney Building which he constructed in Townsville is now listed on the Queensland Heritage Register.

References

1844 births
1926 deaths
Members of the Queensland Legislative Council
Place of birth missing